Andrew Hauptman (born 1969) is an American business executive, philanthropist, and civic leader. Hauptman co-founded the investment firm Andell Holdings which he has helmed since its inception in 1998 and has grown into one of the leading family office entities in the nation.

Early life
Hauptman was born in 1969 on Eglin Air Force Base in Ft. Walton Beach, and raised in Smithtown, New York. His father is a retired pediatrician and his mother is an artist and former college counseling advisor.  He graduated with a B.A. from Yale University and an M.B.A. from Harvard Business School. Early in his career, he worked at Alex. Brown & Sons in New York City and later, as an executive with Universal Studios in London, where he played a key role in the oversight of its international operations. In his youth, he was a competitive soccer and tennis player and participated in social service programs in Latin America (Belize) and Sub-Saharan Africa (Lesotho).

Andell Holdings
Andell invests directly in private and public companies and real estate, acquiring control and minority stakes, as well as with top-tier investment managers across the globe. Andell's real estate platform includes a variety of investments across all asset classes and throughout the capital structure.

Board Affiliations
Hauptman has been a director of numerous public and private companies. He currently serves on the advisory board of Altas Partners and Pendulum Holdings.

Representative Corporate Board Appointments (current and former):
 Altas Partners
 BSN Sports
 Canyon Ranch Holdings
 Dick Clark Productions
 Koor Industries
 Loews Cineplex Entertainment
 Pendulum Holdings
 Storage Mobility (PODS)

Civic and Philanthropic Board Appointments (current and former):
 The Bronfman Hauptman Foundation (Co-Founder & Director, 2006–present)
 Center for American Progress (Board of Directors, 2020–present)
 The Charles Bronfman Prize (Co-Founder & Trustee, 2002–present)
 Chicago Fire Foundation (2007 – 2019)
 City Year (Trustee 2008-2020) (Charter Trustee, 2020 – present)
 City Year Los Angeles (co-founder, 2007; board chair, 2007–2016, 2019–2020; chair emeritus, 2016–present)
 Israel Policy Forum (Advisory Council, 2017–present)
 The Los Angeles Coalition for the Economy and Jobs (Advisory Board, 2015–present)
 Los Angeles Fund for Public Education (Board of Directors, 2011 - 2016)
 Service Year Alliance (Leadership Council & co-chair of Serve America Together campaign)

Key Business Dealings

Chicago Fire Soccer Club
From 2007 to 2019, Hauptman was owner and chairman of Major League Soccer's Chicago Fire Soccer Club. In 2007, Andell purchased the Chicago Fire from billionaire Philip Anschutz's AEG for $35 million. Under Hauptman's ownership, the Club experienced dramatic growth, with the franchise value increasing more than eleven-fold culminating in a sale at $400m.

Growth 
Per The Athletic, Hauptman's 12-year tenure as owner was a transformational one for the franchise and the league. Hauptman entered the league as one of 12 owners; the league has since expanded to include 30 teams. During this period, Hauptman sat on the league's board of governors and was an active member of MLS governance, holding positions on various league committees including the Expansion, Media, Competition, and Advisory Finance Committees. He was closely involved in the design and creation of MLS' logo redesign launched in 2014. Under Hauptman, the Fire made extensive investments in the first team – regularly ranking in the top five in the league in salary outlay – as well as community programming and resources, working to build excitement for the sport from the ground up.

Notable players under Hauptman’s ownership included American star Brian McBride, World Cup Winner Bastian Schweinsteiger, Mexican legends Pavel Pardo and Cuauhtemoc Blanco, and Arsenal star Freddie Ljungberg.

Community 
Hauptman's ownership was marked by emphasizing and establishing deep roots and an ethos of giving across the community. During his tenure, Hauptman constructed the $22 million, 125,000 square foot CIBC Fire Pitch community center on the north side of Chicago serving 300,000 participants annually, launched the Chicago Fire Rec Soccer League (which grew to 20,000 participants), expanded the Chicago Fire Juniors program (from 400 to 16,000 players across six states), and formed the Chicago Fire Academy, one of the first fully scholarshipped programs in the nation, which became a source for star players signed to the first team. Hauptman also expanded the Chicago Fire Foundation and created its award-winning P.L.A.Y.S. (Participate Learn Achieve Youth Soccer) program, which expanded into 30 schools in the Chicago Public Schools district, and formed a partnership with the U.S Soccer Foundation and the city of Chicago to build 50 mini-pitches in underserved neighborhoods across Chicago.

Recognition 
The club was consistently recognized for its deep community engagement, including being awarded ESPN's 2019 Sports Humanitarian Team of the Year Award, the 2017 Corporate Citizen of the Year Award by the Executives' Club of Chicago, the 2016 Beyond Sport Team of the Year, winning over other finalists FC Barcelona, Arsenal FC, the San Francisco Giants, and the Detroit Pistons, and the 2015 Robert Wood Johnson Sport Team of the Year. Mayor Rahm Emanuel praised the "key long-term investments" of the Fire and their ability to "drive tourism and bolster Chicago's future by encouraging our youth to engage in sports and spurring economic development across neighborhoods." He also highlighted the "culture of the Chicago Fire," saying "we're a better city because of what you do." Under Hauptman’s leadership, Chicago competed against Manchester United in Chicago in 2011 and hosted the 2017 MLS All Star Game vs. Real Madrid, at Soldier Field. The games set TV viewership records with the 2017 All Star Game being watched by viewers in 170 countries. Hauptman was inducted into the Chicagoland Sports Hall of Fame as Sports Advocate of the year in 2017 for his singular commitments to the city and to the sport of soccer.

Bridgeview deal 
According to Forbes, the deal to move the team to Bridgeview, IL which pre-dated Hauptman's purchase of the team, meant the Fire were "saddled with one of the worst stadium deals and restrictive leases in American pro sports" due to a lack of public transportation and contextual economic issues which had historically limited the municipality’s investment. Hauptman led a complex and successful multi-year effort to leave Bridgeview and move the team to downtown Chicago and Soldier Field. In 2019, with the support of both Mayors, he brokered deals with the Village of Bridgeview to exit its lease early and closed a three-year deal with the city of Chicago to return to Chicago's Soldier Field, beginning in 2020.

Sale 
In September 2019, after securing the relocation of the team downtown, Hauptman sold his controlling interest in the Fire to Joe Mansueto, founder of Morningstar, Inc., who had purchased a minority stake a year earlier. Mansueto's purchase valued the franchise at $400 million. Mansueto credits Hauptman for having "developed a tremendous platform for continued soccer growth across Chicago and beyond, worked tirelessly to dramatically increase the profile of the Chicago Fire Soccer Club, MLS, and the game overall and... left a wonderful legacy for our City."

In an interview with Forbes, Hauptman said, “I feel good about what’s been accomplished and the foundation that’s been built. The scale of our operations, along with strong management, a great local owner in Joe ... and, importantly for me and my family, an ethos of giving to the community that’s become a core part of the Fire’s culture has set the stage for success as we move downtown. Our move to an historic stadium in the heart of downtown Chicago is a major moment for the club, MLS and the city.”

BSN Sports 
From 2007 until 2013, Hauptman’s holding company Andell was co-owner of BSN Sports, (formerly Sports Supply Group) the largest multi-channel direct marketer, manufacturer and distributor of sporting goods, athletic equipment and team sports apparel in the United States. After acquiring an ownership stake in the publicly-traded business in 2007, Hauptman brought ONCAP Management Partners (a part of Onex Corporation) to the table, and alongside management, orchestrated a take-private transaction in 2010.

In June 2013, a strategic buyer purchased BSN. Andell achieved more than a 4.5x gross multiple of its capital invested, representing a 67.6% gross IRR over the last three-year investment period.

Storage Mobility/PODS 
From 2004 through 2014, Hauptman founded, owned, and operated Storage Mobility, the largest franchisee of PODS Enterprises, Inc.

Under Hauptman’s tenure as chairman of the board, Storage Mobility launched and operated PODS locations in 21 new markets across the United States. In 2014, Hauptman reached an agreement to merge Storage Mobility with PODS which subsequently sold in 2015 to Ontario Teachers for $1 billion.

Altas Partners 
In 2013, Hauptman backed the launch of Toronto-based Altas Partners, Canada’s largest independent private equity firm, managing more than $9 billion in capital. Hauptman currently serves as an advisor and founding Advisory Board member. Altas has acquired businesses including NSC Minerals in 2013 (sold to Kissner Group in 2019); Medforth Global Healthcare Education in 2014 (partially sold to Carlyle Group in 2017, with the remaining sale finalized in 2022); and Capital Vision Services/MyEyeDr in 2015, representing 165 optometry centers serving 1.8 million patients in seven states. MyEyeDr grew to 575 practices in 18 states and was sold to Goldman Sachs for $2.7 billion in 2019.

Philanthropy
Hauptman is a board member of the Center for American Progress, the independent policy institute committed to improving the lives of Americans through bold progressive ideas and leadership. For more than twelve years, Hauptman served as a National Trustee for City Year Inc., an education nonprofit that recruits young adults to serve as AmeriCorps members in under-resourced schools and communities across the nation and was elected Charter Trustee in 2020. Hauptman also co-founded and led the effort to bring City Year to Los Angeles in 2007, where he served as chairman for nine years and continues as Chair Emeritus. He serves on the Leadership Council of Service Year Alliance and is a co-chair of the organization’s “Serve America Together” campaign, which called on 2020 presidential candidates to make national service a priority. Hauptman is also on the advisory board of the Los Angeles Coalition for the Economy and Jobs and the Leadership Council of International Medical Corps.

Hauptman served as president of the Chicago Fire Foundation for twelve years, where he launched the award-winning P.L.A.Y.S. Program. He co-founded and serves as director of the Bronfman Hauptman Foundation, dedicated to social justice, advancements in education, environmental protection, and other philanthropic and civic causes. He is a co-founder and Trustee of the Charles Bronfman Prize, which recognizes young humanitarians whose work is "grounded in their Jewish values and is of universal benefit to all people". Recent laureates include Becca Heller, the co-founder and executive director of International Refugee Assistance Project, Nik Kafka, the founder of Teach a Man to Fish, David Hertz, the co-founder and president of Gastromotiva, and Amy Bach, founder of Measures for Justice.  

Hauptman's notable public contributions include the Obama Foundation, the Mayor's Fund for Los Angeles to support those most adversely affected by the COVID-19 pandemic, and City Year Los Angeles to motivate donors to give in the wake of COVID-19.

Published works 
Hauptman has authored a number of pieces stressing the value of national service and called for strong funding for national service programs. Hauptman has been a contributor on CNN.COM, The74Million, Huffington Post, and Crain's.

Politics 
Hauptman has been a leading contributor nationally to Democratic candidates.

Hauptman was a leading national donor and fundraiser in the 2020 effort to elect President Biden and Vice President Kamala Harris.

Andell Entertainment 
Hauptman previously developed and produced several feature films including State of Play, starring Russell Crowe in 2009, Millions directed by Danny Boyle in 2004, and John Hamburg's directorial debut, Safe Men, which premiered at Sundance in 1998.

Honors and awards 
 2017 Chicagoland Sports Hall of Fame (CSHOF) Inductee 
 2017 City Year Honoree

Personal life
Hauptman is married to Ellen Bronfman Hauptman, the daughter of Canadian businessman Charles Bronfman. They are members of Sinai Temple, a conservative synagogue.

References

External links
Chicago Fire - Official Bio 
Chairman, City Year Los Angeles

1969 births
Jewish American sportspeople
Yale University alumni
Harvard Business School alumni
Bronfman family
Living people
21st-century American Jews